This page is about Si Ni Tang (and NOT Si Ni San)

Si Ni Tang is a brown pill used in Traditional Chinese medicine to "dispel cold and cause restoration upon collapse". It tastes sweet and pungent. It is used upon "collapse with cold sweat, cold limbs, diarrhea with fluid stool containing undigested food, and scarcely perceptible pulse".
The formula (composed of processed Zingiber officinale, Glycyrrhiza uralensis, and Aconitum carmichaelii) has a potential benefit in treating septic shock.

Chinese classic herbal formula

See also
 Chinese classic herbal formula
 Bu Zhong Yi Qi Wan

References

Traditional Chinese medicine pills